Jack Burke (1869–1913) was a boxer who fought in the longest gloved ring battle on record in the late 19th century.

Burke went 110 rounds with Andy Bowen at the Olympic Club in New Orleans on April 6, 1893, in a bout which lasted 7 hours and 19 minutes. The marathon fight was called a "no contest" by referee John Duffy when neither man could continue. Burke broke all the bones in both of his hands and remained bed ridden for 6 weeks after the fight. Burke considered retiring after the fight, but chose to continue competing. Andy Bowen had originally scheduled the fight with another opponent, however after dropping out of the fight, Jack Burke, who was the latter's trainer, fought the bout instead.

It was reported that the fight went for so long, that the spectators who stayed to watch the fight had fallen asleep in their seats. It was also recorded that at round 108, with no clear end in sight, referee John Duffy made the decision that if no winner had emerged in the next 2 rounds, the bout would be ruled a no contest.

"Texas" Jack Burke died at Mublenberg Hospital in October 1913 at the age of 44.

References

External links
 http://www.boxrec.com/media/index.php?title=Human:64402
 http://cyberboxingzone.com/boxing/bowen-andy.htm

1869 births
1942 deaths
Boxers from Louisiana
American male boxers
Lightweight boxers